The 1940–41 Idaho Vandals men's basketball team represented the University of Idaho during the 1940–41 NCAA college basketball season. Members of the Pacific Coast Conference, the Vandals were led by fifth-year head coach Forrest Twogood and played their home games on campus at Memorial Gymnasium in Moscow, Idaho.

This was Twogood's fifth and final year at Idaho; he coached baseball in the spring and then went to San Francisco for a year, served in the U.S. Navy during World War II, returned to USC in Los Angeles, and was the Trojans' head basketball coach for sixteen seasons 

Idaho's athletic department underwent a major overhaul in March 1941 with the hiring of George Greene as athletic director, Francis Schmidt as football coach, and Guy Wicks as basketball and baseball coach.

References

External links
Sports Reference – Idaho Vandals: 1940–41 basketball season
Gem of the Mountains: 1941 University of Idaho yearbook – 1940–41 basketball season
Idaho Argonaut – student newspaper – 1941 editions

Idaho Vandals men's basketball seasons
Idaho
Idaho
Idaho